Billy Wayne Davis is an American stand-up comedian, writer, and host.

He is originally from Crossville, TN and has been touring the United States for close to ten years. He has worked with well-known comics such as Colin Quinn, Lisa Lampanelli, Louis C.K., and Mitch Hedberg. He has also toured extensively with Ralphie May.

His debut self-titled comedy album was released in 2012 on the Rooftop Comedy label.

Comedy albums
Billy Wayne Davis (2012)
Live At Third Man Records (2016)
Testify (2022)

References

American male comedians
Living people
Comedians from Tennessee
Year of birth missing (living people)
People from Crossville, Tennessee
Third Man Records artists